USS Aegir (AS-23) was the lead ship of the  in the United States Navy during World War II.

Construction
Aegir was laid down on 31 March 1943 under a Maritime Commission contract, MC hull 856, by the Ingalls Shipbuilding Company in Pascagoula, Mississippi and launched on 15 September 1943, sponsored by Mrs. James A. Sweeney. The ship was acquired by the Navy and placed in temporary commission on 20 November 1943 for passage to her conversion yard where she was turned over to the Todd Shipyards Corporation, Brooklyn, New York, for conversion to a submarine tender on 3 December 1943. Aegir was placed in full commission at the Brooklyn Navy Yard on 8 September 1944.

Service history
In early October, Aegir reported to New London, Connecticut for shakedown. On 23 October, the tender got underway for Pearl Harbor via the Panama Canal and San Diego. She reached Hawaii on 18 November and was assigned to Submarine Squadron 24 (SubRon 24). Aegir traveled to Midway later that month. She remained stationed at that island until 1 September 1945. During this period, Aegir furnished refitting and tender services to the submarines of SubRon 24.

Aegir returned to the west coast of the United States on 11 September and was moored at the Mare Island Naval Shipyard. There, she furnished services to submarines awaiting decommissioning. Aegir was placed out of commission, in reserve, at Mare Island on 18 October 1946. Then in 1960 used as a maintenance ship at San Diego PacResFlt and then returned to Mare Island Naval Shipyard and remained there until her name was struck from the Navy list on 1 June 1971. The ship was sold on 16 May 1972 to National Metal and Steel at Terminal Island, California, and scrapped.

Notes 

Citations

Bibliography 

Online resources*

External links

Aegir-class submarine tenders
Submarine tenders
Submarine tenders of the United States Navy
United States Navy
Ships built in Pascagoula, Mississippi
1943 ships
World War II auxiliary ships of the United States